The Hellenic Red Cross is the Greek national Red Cross Society, founded on 10 June 1877.

External links
  Official Hellenic Red Cross website

1877 establishments in Greece
Greece
Medical and health organizations based in Greece
Organizations established in 1877